IPPF can refer to

 International Penal and Penitentiary Foundation
 International Planned Parenthood Federation
 International Professional Practices Framework from the Institute of Internal Auditors